The Pakistan Triathlon Federation is the governing body to develop and promote the Triathlon sport in Pakistan. The Federation is based in Faisalabad.

The Federation is affiliated with International Triathlon Union and its continental association Asian Triathlon Confederation.

References

 

Sports governing bodies in Pakistan
National members of the Asian Triathlon Confederation